Who Is Chris Rock? is a short film about the life of comedian Chris Rock directed by Michael J. Dennis. It showcased Rock and his mother talking about his life and work.

References

External links 
 
 Youtube link
The Comic's Comic Blog
Shadow And Act Blog post

Documentary films about comedy and comedians
Documentary films about entertainers
1989 films
1980s short documentary films
American short documentary films
1980s English-language films
1980s American films